Obtest is an extreme metal band from Vilnius, Lithuania. They started out in 1992 as a brutal death metal act, but soon changed the style to black metal. Their lyrics are related to Lithuanian mythology and are sung in Lithuanian, though a few of the songs on their demos were in English. The band currently refers their music style as "heathen war heavy metal."

Current line-up 
Sadlave - guitar (also in Notanga, ex-Burying Place, Fanarai, ex-Anubi, Agyria, Trolis & The Giberlingers, ex-Ruination)
Baalberith - vocals
Karolis - bass
Insmuth - drums
Enrikas Slavinskis - guitars (ex-Fata Morgana (Ltu), ex-Stone's Lament, Soul Stealer, Loosers, Crossroad, Degradatonia)

Former members 
 Demonas - bass (also in Burying Place, ex-Zalvarinis)

Discography 
Oldness Coming (Demo, 1995) - the title is misspelled "Comming" on the album cover.
Live At Poltergeist (VHS video, 1995)
Prieš Audrą (Demo, 1995)
Tūkstantmetis (Full-length, 1997)
9 9 7 (EP, 1998)
Prisiek (EP, 2001)
Auka Seniems Dievams (Full-length, 2001)
Dvylika JuodVarnių (EP, 2003)
Tėvynei (Video CD, 2004)
Iš Kartos Į Kartą (Full-length, 2005)
Prieš Audrą (MiniLP, 2006)
Gyvybės medis (Full-length, 2008)

External links
 Official Obtest home page
 Official Obtest myspace page
 Obtest's label Ledo Takas Records

Musical groups established in 1992
Lithuanian black metal musical groups
Lithuanian folk metal musical groups
Musical quintets